This is a list of all tornadoes that were confirmed by local offices of the National Weather Service in the United States in September 2011.

United States yearly total

September

September 1 event

September 3 event
This events were related to Tropical Storm Lee.

September 4 event
The events in AL, MS, and FL were related to Tropical Storm Lee.

September 5 event
The events were related to Tropical Storm Lee.

September 6 event
The events were related to Tropical Storm Lee.

September 7 event
The events were related to Tropical Storm Lee.

September 14 event

September 15 event

September 17 event

September 18 event

September 19 event

September 22 event

September 25 event

September 27 event

September 28 event

September 29 event

October

October 5 event

October 6 event

October 7 event

October 8 event

October 9 event

October 10 event

October 12 event

October 13 event

October 18 event

October 29 event

See also
Tornadoes of 2011

References

United States,09
Tornadoes,09
2011,09
Tornadoes
Tornadoes